The 2020–21 UAE President's Cup was the 44th edition of the UAE President's Cup, following the cancellation of the 2019–20 UAE President's Cup due to the COVID-19 pandemic. Shabab Al Ahli won their tenth title after beating Al Nasr in the final.

Preliminary round
The preliminary round was contested between the teams of the UAE Division 1 teams divided into two groups, 6 teams in group A, 5 teams in group B, the winner of each group advances to the knockout stage.

Group A

Group B

Bracket

Knockout stage
The knockout stage was played between the UAE Pro League teams and two teams from the preliminary round, Emirates and Al Urooba as they both won their respective groups.

Round of 16
All times are local (UTC+04:00)

Quarter-finals
Emirates was the only UAE First Division League team to participate in this round.

Semi-finals
The semi-finals were held in neutral stadiums.

Final

References

UAE President's Cup seasons
UAE
President's Cup